Łupawa  (formerly German Lupow) is a village in the administrative district of Gmina Potęgowo, within Słupsk County, Pomeranian Voivodeship, in northern Poland. The village has a population of 730.

The place was first mentioned in 1282. From the 15th until the 18th century Łupawa enjoyed some importance as it was situated on the road from Szczecin to Gdańsk. In 1689 Łupawa was chartered as a town.

References

Villages in Słupsk County